Oleg Petrovich Zhakov (1 April 1905 in Sarapul, Vyatka Governorate – 4 May 1988 in Pyatigorsk, Stavropol Krai) was a Soviet and Russian film actor. He performed in more than sixty films between 1927 up to 1988. People's Artist of the USSR (1969). Winner of USSR State Prize (1971) and the Stalin Prize of the second degree (1946).

He graduated from the Leningrad College of Performing Arts (1929).

He starred in more than a hundred films.

Since 1957 he lived in Pyatigorsk, where he died on May 4, 1988. He was buried at Krasnoslobodskoye Сemetery in Pyatigorsk.

Selected filmography

References

External links

1905 births
1988 deaths
20th-century Russian male actors
People from Sarapul
People from Sarapulsky Uyezd
Russian State Institute of Performing Arts alumni
Honored Artists of the RSFSR
People's Artists of the USSR
Stalin Prize winners
Recipients of the Order of Friendship of Peoples
Recipients of the Order of the Red Banner of Labour
Recipients of the Order of the Red Star
Recipients of the USSR State Prize
Recipients of the Vasilyev Brothers State Prize of the RSFSR
Russian male film actors
Russian male silent film actors
Russian male voice actors
Soviet male film actors
Soviet male silent film actors

Soviet male voice actors